Daniel Sigman is an American geoscientist, and the Dusenbury Professor of Geological and Geophysical Sciences at Princeton University. Sigman received a MacArthur Foundation "genius grant" in 2009.

Life
He graduated from Stanford University with a B.S. in 1991, and from the Massachusetts Institute of Technology /Woods Hole Oceanographic Institution’s Joint Program in Oceanography, with a Ph.D. in 1997.

He studies the global cycles of biologically active elements, in particular, nitrogen and carbon, and he is active in the development of analytical techniques for studying nitrogen in the environment. He also investigates the history of these cycles in order to understand the causes of past changes in the atmospheric concentration of carbon dioxide, the role of this greenhouse gas in the waxing and waning of ice ages, and the ocean’s response to climate change. He is now married and is a father of two.

Awards
2012 Science Innovation Award Heinz A. Lowenstam medal co-recipient with Katherine Freeman for work in biogeochemistry 
2009 MacArthur Fellows Program
2009 Blavatnik Award for Young Scientists
2004 Bessel Award of the Humboldt Foundation
2004 James B. Macelwane Medal

References

American earth scientists
MacArthur Fellows
Stanford University alumni
Massachusetts Institute of Technology alumni
Living people
Year of birth missing (living people)